Roberto Mazzucato (born 13 March 1954) is a retired male triple jumper from Italy.

Biography
His personal best jump was 16.92 metres, achieved in August 1979 in Turin. The Italian record currently belongs to Fabrizio Donato with 17.60 metres. He has 32 caps in national team from 1973 to 1986.

Achievements

National titles
He has won 6 times the individual national championship.
3 wins in the triple jump (1977, 1979, 1982)
3 wins in the triple jump indoor (1982, 1983, 1986)

See also
 Italian all-time top lists - Triple jump
 Triple jump winners of Italian Athletics Championships
 Italy at the 1979 Summer Universiade

References

External links
 
 Roberto Mazzucato at All-athletics.com

1954 births
Italian male triple jumpers
Universiade medalists in athletics (track and field)
Living people
Universiade bronze medalists for Italy
Medalists at the 1979 Summer Universiade